Keni Styles (born 27 May 1981) is a British former pornographic actor of Thai descent.

Early life
Styles was born to a single mother who was a sex worker in Thailand. They moved to the United Kingdom when she married a British national. When the marriage ended, she moved back to Thailand, leaving Styles at an orphanage, where he lived until the age of 16. After living several years in a halfway house, he started boxing and joined the British Army and served in Northern Ireland, Bosnia, Kosovo twice, and Iraq twice during his seven years of active duty. After leaving the army, he entered the pornography industry, starting a company called "Superman Stamina".

Career
Styles was active in pornographic movies from August 2006, and retired in 2015. He first found steady work in Eastern Europe, relocating to live in both Prague and Budapest. In January 2010, Styles moved to Los Angeles. He is regarded as the first heterosexual Asian male porn star in American pornography by some. In July 2015, Styles announced his retirement from the porn industry on his blog, KeniCamz.

Awards

See also
 List of British pornographic actors

References

Further reading

External links
 
 
 
 
 
 

1981 births
British male pornographic film actors
Thai emigrants to the United Kingdom
Living people
Thai expatriates in the United States